Heritage Guitar is an American musical instruments manufacturer company based in Kalamazoo, Michigan. The company produces  a range of electric guitars that includes hollow-body models.

History
Heritage Guitars was founded in 1985 by three former employees of the Gibson guitar factory, Jim Deurloo, Marv Lamb, and JP Moats. Other former Gibson employees that took part of the recently created company were Bill Paige and Mike Korpak.

In the early 1980s, Gibson, faced with excess production capacity, closed its historic Parsons Street factory in Kalamazoo, Michigan and relocated much of its production to its factory in Nashville, Tennessee. Some of the Gibson employees who did not want to move their homes and families to Tennessee started production of guitars under a new name, "Heritage," which was likely meant to stake a claim to their guitar-making tradition. The company set up their new factory in part of Gibson's former Kalamazoo premises, but produced instruments in much smaller numbers than Gibson had.

The Heritage line initially consisted of electric and acoustic guitars, electric basses, mandolins, and a banjo. The line was eventually narrowed to electric guitars only.  Although most Heritage guitars were, and continue to be, based on Gibson designs, a few of their early electric guitars were based on modified Stratocaster and Telecaster designs.

Current status 

Heritage Guitars is a boutique manufacturer, making semi-hollow guitars, large jazz boxes, and solid body electrics.  In these types of guitars, Gibson guitars are the closest nominal equivalents, though Heritage is a much smaller company making far fewer guitars.

In general, Heritage makes guitars that are similar to Gibson's products, which the company's advocates and fans would say are constructed in a much more "hand-made" fashion, and with much greater individual attention to detail by the builders. Part of this increased attention to detail is a result of Heritage being a smaller operation than Gibson, and some of it is likely a reaction against the cost-cutting practices that developed at Gibson under Norlin's ownership.  The design of the Heritage H-150 solid-body guitar is clearly modeled on the Les Paul Standard, while the H-575 resembles the ES-175 and the H-535 reinterprets the ES-335.  There are differences between most of the Heritage models and their Gibson counterparts, however.  For example, all Heritage full-body semi-acoustics have solid wood tops, while many of the Gibson guitars of this type had laminated tops after World War II.  Both the H-575 and the H-535 are thinner than their Gibson cousins. Heritage has also introduced several new designs, most notably the Millennium models, which employ a "semi-solid" body that is more solid than a traditional semi-hollow design, but chambered, and thus less solid than a typical solid body.

Heritage Guitars are made without the use of CNC machines for woodworking, utilizing a crude carver machine built by the original employees.  Heritage is clear about the fact that their guitars are manufactured with no claims that they are handmade (although the website states "The art of handcrafting fine American made instruments continues..."). Such claims tend to arise from the company's fans and advocates, who are a small, but enthusiastic and loyal bunch.

During the first several years of the company, Heritage advertised its guitars in the usual guitar magazines.  The marketing was handled by the former VP of sales from Gibson, Lane Zastrow. The advertisements made it clear that Heritage was making guitars on Parsons Street in Kalamazoo, without ever mentioning Gibson by name, and the company began to develop an image as the alternative to Gibson at a time when Gibson was going through a period of transition and rebuilding.  In the 1990s, in an attempt to keep costs down, the company all but stopped advertising.  This lack of an advertising presence significantly diminished the brand's name recognition among guitarists.

Endorsers

Johnny Smith
In 1989, jazz guitarist Johnny Smith withdrew his endorsement from Gibson and awarded it to Heritage, which began production of the "Heritage Johnny Smith".  The Gibson model continued in production as the "Gibson LeGrand".

Smith had since moved his endorsement from Heritage to the Guild Guitar Company.

Henry Johnson

Jazz guitarist, producer, and composer Henry Johnson, was the second endorser of Heritage Guitars, beginning in 1985. In 1986, Johnson's first solo recording came out on Impulse/MCA records and was met with popular acclaim, including a Grammy nomination. Johnson's recordings were popular throughout the 1990s, which raised the visibility of Heritage Guitars into the mainstream forefront of TV, music magazines, and news publications. Because of a court order, Heritage was unable to talk about themselves or tell anyone of their true identities. Because Johnson did a large number of interviews and TV shows, he was able to promote Heritage Guitars more than other artists who were endorsing them. Business flourished after Johnson revealed the identities of the luthiers behind Heritage Guitars. Johnson has been an endorser for almost 30 years, and his Heritage Signature model has been in production since 2008.

Alex Skolnick

Guitarist Alex Skolnick, of the band Testament, formerly endorsed Heritage Guitars.  He is known for his jazz-oriented playing. For jazz, Skolnick played an H-575, and for rock he played an H-150. For a short time, the Heritage Guitar company offered an "Alex Skolnick signature model H-150". In 2013 Skolnick announced his endorsement of ESP Guitars.  Skolnick is now an endorser of Godin Jazz guitars.

David Becker
Jazz guitarist, composer and two time Grammy nominee, David Becker, has been endorsing Heritage Guitars for more than 30 years. He was one of the first artists to join Heritage in 1988. The "David Becker H-575 Signature Model"  features a solid spruce top, maple sides and back and a humbucker and piezo pickup.

Roy Clark
Country musician Roy Clark endorsed Heritage guitars, which makes a signature model.

Mimi Fox
Jazz guitarist Mimi Fox's guitars are a "Golden Eagle" and H-575 custom with a spruce top.

Kenny Burrell
American jazz guitarist Kenny Burrell plays a "Heritage Super KB" hollow body through a "Heritage 1 x 12 Kenny Burrell" combo amp.

References

References

External links

NAMM Oral History Interview with Marvin Lamb June 9, 2005
NAMM Oral History Interview with James Deurloo June 9, 2005
NAMM Oral History Interview with Lane Zastrow July 19, 2014

Guitar manufacturing companies of the United States
Manufacturing companies based in Kalamazoo, Michigan